Nocton and Dunston railway station served Nocton and Dunston in Lincolnshire which shared a GNR/GER Joint railway station until it was closed for passengers in 1955 and freight in 1964. Trains still run along the Peterborough to Lincoln Line, but do not stop at the former station. When travelling along the B1188 road from Lincoln to Sleaford visitors can see the old station house on the opposite side of the road from the quarry.

References

Disused railway stations in Lincolnshire
Former Great Northern and Great Eastern Joint Railway stations
Railway stations in Great Britain opened in 1882
Railway stations in Great Britain closed in 1955